Plamenih 5 (trans. The Flaming 5) were a Yugoslav rock band formed in Belgrade in 1964. Despite having no official releases, the band are notable as one of the pioneers of the Yugoslav rock scene.

History

1964-1969
The band was formed in 1964. The first lineup featured Branislav Aranđelović (guitar), Dragoljub Pavlović (bass guitar), Miomir Petrović (rhtythm guitar), Dragoslav Lazarević (keyboards) and Dobrivoje Radojević (drums). The band's later lineups featured bass guitarist Slobodan "Boba" Orlić and rhythm guitarist Vojislav Čobanski.

Initially the band performed mostly the covers of beat hits. During 1965 the band held regular performances at the Euridika club in Belgrade. In May of the same year they won the first place at the Festival of Youth, and in December of the same year the band performed on the Parada ritma (Parade of Rhythm) festival in Hall 3 of the Belgrade Fair. At the beginning of 1966 they were joined by vocalist Haim Moreno, and in January 1966 the band competed on the Belgrade Gitarijada festival, winning the third place. Shortly after that they performed at Božidar Adžija People's University hall alongside the band Čavke and the Germany-based singer Danica Mihajlović "Daniela". In 1966 the band made their only recordings, when they performed as the backing band for Danica Mihajlović on her EP I Got You Baby. The EP featured the song "Ja nekoga želim" ("I Want Somebody"), which was later, under the title "I Need Somebody", covered by British pop singer Don Fardon.

During 1967 they often performed the song "Skarlet" ("Scarlet"), making a recording of it for Radio Belgrade, the recording becoming a minor hit for the band. For the TV show Koncert za ludi mladi svet (Concert for Young Crazy World) they recorded the song "Ja nikad nisam bio sam" ("I Was Never Alone").

At the end of 1967 Moreno was replaced by Miloš Stajić, and Aranđelović was replaced by Ljuba Sedlar. During this year Dragoljub Pavlović wrote the song "Oči" ("Eyes") for the omnibus film Vreme ljubavi (The Time of Love), for the story "Kavez" ("The Cage"); however, the film was never shown, possibly because it dealt with drug addiction.

Towards the end of the decade, the band moved towards more complex sound, but failed to achieve mainstream popularity. They disbanded at the end of the 1960s.

Post breakup
After he left Plamenih 5, Branislav Aranđelović formed the band Plamenih 6, which featured Miodrag Nedeljković (bass guitar), Lazar Paskul (organ), Dušan Ranković (trumpet), Miroslav Filipović (trombone) and Radomir Trivić (drums). Initially they performed as the backing band for Nina Spirova, Tomi Sovilj and Gordana Krisper. They had a diverse repertoire, but failed to reach larger popularity. In the 1980s Aranđelović played with Rokeri s Moravu.

During the 1970s Orlić was a member of Siluete and Opus. Dragoslav Lazarević worked as a sound recorder at Radio Belgrade.

In 2000 the bands song "Ja nikad nisam bio sam", originally recorded for Television Belgrade, was released on the various artists compilation album Jugobeat Explosion: 60s Punk From Yugoslavia by the Dutch record label Red Beat.

References

External links
Plamenih 5 at Discogs

Serbian rock music groups
Yugoslav rock music groups
Beat groups
Musical groups from Belgrade
Musical groups established in 1963
Musical groups disestablished in 1969